Tibor Bastrnák (born 17 November 1964 in Šahy) is a Slovak politician who served as a member of the National Council in 2002–2020 in the Party of the Hungarian Community caucus (until 2009) and from 2009 in the Most–Híd caucus. As a senior member of Most-Híd, he was among the supporters of coalition with Direction – Slovak Social Democracy.

In addition to national politics, Bastrnák served the major of Komárno in 2003–2010.

Bastrnák studied medicine at the Masaryk University. Following his graduation, he worked as a gynecologist in a local hospital in Komárno.

References 

Most–Híd politicians
People from Šahy
Living people
1964 births
Hungarians in Slovakia
Party of the Hungarian Community politicians
Slovak politicians
Members of the National Council (Slovakia) 2002-2006
Members of the National Council (Slovakia) 2006-2010
Members of the National Council (Slovakia) 2010-2012
Members of the National Council (Slovakia) 2012-2016
Members of the National Council (Slovakia) 2016-2020